The Navy Stadium is a multi-use stadium in Sattahip, Chonburi Province, Thailand.  It is currently being used mostly for navy personnel and family football matches and is the home stadium of Navy F.C.  The stadium holds up to 6,000 people.

References

Sattahip District
Football venues in Thailand
Sport in Chonburi province
Buildings and structures in Chonburi province